Dzhilikhur is a rural locality (a selo) and the administrative centre of Myukhrekskoye Rural Settlement, Rutulsky District, Republic of Dagestan, Russia. The population was 743 as of 2010. There are 5 streets.

Geography 
Dzhilikhur is located in the valley of the Kara-Samur river, 22 km northwest of Rutul (the district's administrative centre) by road. Tsudik and Aran are the nearest rural localities.

Nationalities 
Rutuls live there.

References 

Rural localities in Rutulsky District